The fourth season of Australia's I'm a Celebrity...Get Me Out of Here, which was commissioned by Network Ten on 8 November 2017, premiered on 28 January 2018 and concluded on 12 March 2018. The season contained the show’s 100th episode  which was broadcast on 5 February 2018. Comedian Fiona O'Loughlin won the series, beating singer Shannon Noll and boxer Danny Green, and was crowned  "Queen of the Jungle", the $100,000 prize money, was won for her selected charity, Angel Flight.

Celebrities

Celebrity guests

Results and elimination
 Indicates that the celebrity received the most votes from the public
 Indicates that the celebrity was immune from the vote
 Indicates that the celebrity was named as being in the bottom 2 or 3.
  Indicates that the celebrity received the fewest votes and was eliminated immediately (no bottom three)
  Indicates that the celebrity withdrew from the competition

Tucker Trials
The contestants take part in daily trials to earn food. These trials aim to test both physical and mental abilities. Success is usually determined by the number of stars collected during the trial, with each star representing a meal earned by the winning contestant for their camp mates.

 The public voted for who they wanted to face the trial
 The contestants decided who did which trial
 The trial was compulsory and neither the public nor celebrities decided who took part 
 The contestants were chosen by the evicted celebrities

Notes
Anthony had to decide which two contestants had to do the Tucker Trial.
As the tucker trial was created before Bernard departed, the contestants were still able to try and win 10 stars instead of nine.
The tucker trial involved both Anthony & Danny weighing themselves in at the beginning, eating all different types of disgusting foods and then weighing themselves again, who ever gained the most weight would win. Both contestants had supporters, the winner would receive meals for himself and his supporters. Danny's supporters were Fiona & Peter.
Tiffany's fear of heights made her exclude herself from the challenge, as a result Chris decided to take her place for her.
The trial was called blind soccer- with the celebrities being blindfolded and an assortment of animals introduced onto the pitch during and in between rounds. The game was boys VS girls- with the boys winning 4:3. There was one round where the hosts (Dr Chris Brown and Lady Julia Morris) allowed the girls to take off their blindfolds as they were losing.
Before the trial the celebrities picked teams- one being Peter's and the other Simone's. Simone's team won the trial so they got to 'feast like kings'. Peter's team (who lost the trial) survived on very small portions of rationed rice and beans for dinner.
During this episode the celebrities were reunited with their family members as it was their third-last day in camp. The family members stayed with their celebrity for the day and a one of them took part in the tucker trial with the celebrity. In the end they found all the stars and had a KFC family feast for dinner. This was enjoyed with all of the family members.

Star count

Camp Leader

Celebrity Chest Challenges

Two or more celebrities are chosen to take part in the "Celebrity Chest" challenge to win luxuries for camp. Each challenge involves completing a task to win a chest to take back to camp. However, to win the luxury item in the chest, the campmates must correctly answer a question. If they fail to answer correctly, the luxury item is forfeited and a joke prize is won. . This process is used in 'most' of the Chest Challenges. The luxury item is "donated" by a celebrity from the outside, mostly one who previously competed on a previous season.

 The celebrities got the question correct
 The celebrities got the question wrong

Notes
The five celebrities in the chest challenge opened the chest, the five celebrities were awarded a pirate party with snacks and alcoholic beverages, but it was only for them and they could not tell the rest of the celebrities about the party.

Ratings

Ratings data is from OzTAM and represents the live and same day average viewership from the 5 largest Australian metropolitan centres (Sydney, Melbourne, Brisbane, Perth and Adelaide).
This was the 100th episode of "I'm a Celebrity...Get Me Out of Here!" to air on Network Ten.

References

04
2018 Australian television seasons